"Jimi Hendrix" is a song by Swedish pop boyband The Fooo Conspiracy. The song was released as a digital download in Sweden on 4 December 2015 through Artist House Stockholm. The song did not enter the Swedish Singles Chart, but peaked to number 13 on the Sweden Heatseeker Songs.

Track listing

Chart performance

Weekly charts

Release history

References

2015 singles
2015 songs
Songs written by J. R. Rotem
Songs written by Erik Hassle
Songs written by Marcus Sepehrmanesh
FO&O songs